The Grey is a 2011 survival film co-written, produced and directed by Joe Carnahan and starring Liam Neeson, Frank Grillo, Dallas Roberts, Joe Anderson, Nonso Anozie, and Dermot Mulroney. It is based on the short story "Ghost Walker" by Ian MacKenzie Jeffers, who also co-wrote the screenplay with Carnahan. The story follows a number of oil-men stranded in Alaska after a plane crash, who must wage a war against multiple packs of Canadian grey wolves, stalking them during the mercilessly cold weather.

Released in the United States on January 27, 2012, the film received positive reviews, with praise for its philosophical themes, and for Liam Neeson's performance. It grossed $81 million worldwide.

Plot 
John Ottway is a sharpshooter for an oil company in Alaska, primarily killing grey wolves that threaten the drillers. On his last day on the job, he sees a wolf pursuing a pipeline worker and shoots it, listening to the wolf's final breath. That evening, Ottway writes a letter "without purpose" to his wife, Ana, explaining his plans to kill himself, but does not follow through. The next day, Ottway boards a plane that will take him back to Anchorage for his two weeks off. However, the plane begins to have major turbulence and falls apart, crashing somewhere in the remote Alaskan wilderness.

Only a handful of people survive the crash, including Ottway. Ottway sees Chavis calling for help, pinned down, stabbing his leg on his seat and his leg got stuck. Ottway helps him, though Chavis has hypoxia. Ottway finds Hernandez before they find Flannery sleeping. Ottway and Hernandez take Flannery to the crash, finding Talget, Diaz, and Burke. Henrick watches helplessly as Lewenden has a lot of blood on his abdomen. Ottway talks quietly to Lewenden before he dies of his injuries.

Ottway takes charge of the survivors, and sees one of the flight attendants moving. He runs to help her, only to realize that the movement came from a wolf feeding on her corpse. Ottway is attacked by the wolf, but is rescued by the group; Diaz finds Calfskin's body. Ottway realizes that the plane has crashed in the wolves' territory and they take turns keeping watch. While on watch, Hernandez is killed by two wolves, and Ottway suggests that they should leave the crash site to avoid further attacks, but Diaz questions his leadership. While searching for the wallets of the dead to return to their families, Diaz finds an emergency wrist watch with a radio beacon, which he vainly hopes will send for rescue.

While attempting to reach the nearby treeline, Flannery falls behind and is killed by three wolves. The survivors run for the trees, lighting a fire to ward off the animals and building makeshift weaponry. Diaz succumbs to stress and threatens Ottway with a knife but is quickly disarmed. Before he can apologize, he is attacked by a wolf, which the group manages to kill and roast for food. Ottway surmises that the wolf was an omega sent by the alpha wolf to test the group. A crazed Diaz beheads the wolf's corpse, throwing the severed head at the pack, which causes the wolves to howl in rage.

By the fire, Diaz tells the group of his atheism and Talget states that he believes in God and lovingly talks about his daughter. Ottway says that he is also an atheist, but wishes that he could believe or have faith, and recites a simple poem written by his father. The next day, a blizzard hits and Burke, who had been suffering from hypoxia, is found dead. The remaining survivors travel to the edge of a canyon. Henrick secures a line to a tree on the opposite side, and Diaz and Ottway traverse the canyon. Talget gets his foot caught on a hook, and the rope breaks away and he falls to the ground. Barely alive, he hallucinates a vision of his daughter, and is dragged away and gets ripped apart by wolves. Attempting to save Talget, Diaz falls from the tree and badly injures his knee.

Diaz, Ottway, and Henrick arrive at a river where Diaz, humbled by his journey and unable to walk, explains that he can accept dying in the middle of nature. Leaving Diaz to his fate, Ottway and Henrick continue and are set upon by the wolves. Henrick falls into the river and is trapped beneath the surface; Ottway is unable to pull him loose, and Hendrick drowns. Now alone, Ottway angrily appeals to God to "show him something real," but seeing nothing, decides that he will "do it [himself.]"

Exhausted and suffering from hypothermia, Ottway eventually stops walking and goes through the collected wallets before arranging them into a cross. He realizes too late that he has stumbled right into the wolves' den – the team had been walking towards, not away from, the danger. Surrounded by the wolf pack and facing its leader, Ottway looks at his wife's photo in his wallet. It is revealed that she was dying of a terminal illness, the reason for his suicidal tendencies earlier. As the alpha wolf approaches, Ottway arms himself with a knife and shards of liquor bottles taped to his hand. He recites the words in a voice-over, "Once more into the fray. Into the last good fight I'll ever know. Live and die on this day. Live and die on this day", and then charges the alpha wolf. In the aftermath, Ottway and the alpha wolf are shown breathing heavily and lying down on each other, leaving their fates unknown.

Cast 
 Liam Neeson as John Ottway
 Frank Grillo as John Diaz
 Dermot Mulroney as Jerome Talget
 Dallas Roberts as Pete Hendrick
 Joe Anderson as Todd Flannery
 Nonso Anozie as Jackson Burke
 James Badge Dale as Luke Lewenden
 Ben Bray as Dwayne Hernandez
 Greg Nicotero as Duke Chavis
 Jacob Blair as Simon Cimoski
 Anne Openshaw as Ana Ottway

Production 
The Grey reunited director Joe Carnahan with producers Ridley Scott and Tony Scott (credited as executive producer) as well as actor Liam Neeson, who collaborated on the 2010 action film The A-Team. The film initially imagined a much-younger lead character and
Bradley Cooper, who also worked with Carnahan on The A-Team, was cast in the lead role, but he was eventually replaced by Neeson.

Filming began in January 2011 and ended in March. The film was shot in forty days in Vancouver and Smithers, British Columbia, with several scenes shot at the
Smithers Regional Airport. According to Empire magazine, in the climactic scene in which Neeson's character pens a letter to his wife, Carnahan urged Neeson to "channel his grief" over the death of his wife Natasha Richardson. Carnahan disclosed, in a Q&A session following an early screening at the Aero Theatre in Santa Monica, he had an alternative ending he never intended to use showing Neeson battling the alpha wolf. It was supposed to be included in deleted cuts; however, no extras were included on the Blu-ray.

Release 
The world premiere of The Grey took place on January 11, 2012, at the Regal Cinemas Theatre in Los Angeles. The film was released nationwide on January 27, 2012.

Marketing 
Promotion for The Grey in part targeted Christian groups by issuing a "film companion", which highlighted the spiritual value of the film. Marketing also partnered with The Weather Network to highlight the hazardous filming conditions. Open Road Films incorporated comments tweeted by film critics to promote the film in the third trailer for The Grey. This was the first time tweets from and Twitter handles for professional critics had been used in a film trailer.

Music 

The score for The Grey was released on CD February 14, 2012. A digital version available for download was released on January 24, 2012.

Reception

Critical response 
On Rotten Tomatoes, the film has an approval rating of 79% based on 209 reviews, with an average rating of 6.90/10. The site's critical consensus reads, "The Grey is an exciting tale of survival, populated with fleshed-out characters and a surprising philosophical agenda." On Metacritic, the film has a weighted average score of 64 out of 100, based on reviews from 35 critics, indicating "generally favorable reviews". Audiences polled by CinemaScore gave the film an average grade of "B−" on an A+ to F scale.

Roger Ebert gave the film 3 and a half stars out of 4, and wrote the unrelenting harshness of The Grey so affected him, he departed the screening of a different movie on the same day:

The film also earned a place on A.O. Scott's list of the year's ten best films, and Slate film critic Dana Stevens included it in her runners-up for the year's best movies.  Film critic Richard Roeper also had The Grey in his top 10 best movies of 2012 list, placing it at number 3.

Dissenters' reviews tend to focus on the film's abrupt ending, and perceive the emotional and philosophical undertones as unnecessary. Siobhan Synnot of The Scotsman gave the film two stars, commenting "On the down side, there's a lot of dull pretentious philosophizing about the heartlessness of nature and God. On the up side, you get to see a man punch a wolf in the face." Some reviewers and analysts say the film has an atheist theme, due to characters such as John Ottway (Liam Neeson) pleading for divine help but not getting any.

Box office 
The Grey opened in North America on January 27, 2012 in 3,185 theaters and grossed $19.7 million in its opening weekend, with an average of $6,174 per theater, finishing first. The film ultimately earned $51.6 million domestically, and $29.7 million internationally, for a total of $81.2 million, against its $25 million production budget.

Controversy 
On January 19, 2012, British Columbia's The Province featured an article about the movie's crew buying four wolf carcasses, two for props for the film and two wolves for the cast to eat. This angered environmentalists and animal activists, irate because the film depicts wolves in a negative light, specifically at a time grey wolves are not on any Endangered Species Act in many western American states.  In response to the portrayal of wolves in the film, groups including PETA and WildEarth Guardians started drives to boycott the film. Open Road responded by placing a fact sheet about the grey wolf on the film's official website while the Sierra Club cooperated. Carnahan responded to the criticism by saying the film is meant to reflect humanity's internal spiritual journeys.

References

External links 

 
 Smithers Regional Airport

2011 films
Films with atheism-related themes
2011 action drama films
2010s disaster films
American action adventure films
American adventure drama films
American disaster films
American action drama films
American survival films
British thriller films
Entertainment One films
Films about aviation accidents or incidents
Films about death
Films based on short fiction
Films directed by Joe Carnahan
Films set in Alaska
Films set in the Arctic
Films shot in Vancouver
Open Road Films films
Scott Free Productions films
Films about wolves
Films with screenplays by Joe Carnahan
Films produced by Joe Carnahan
Films scored by Marc Streitenfeld
Films critical of religion
2010s survival films
2010s English-language films
2010s American films
2010s British films
2011 thriller drama films